Divisional general  Claude Meier  is a Swiss professional officer (Divisional general) of the Swiss Armed Forces.

Current tasks
As Head of the Army Division of the Swiss Army, Divisional general Meier is responsible for the most important business concerns in the Defense Department, and is directly responsible to the Chief of the Armed Forces. He is responsible for the operational implementation of the political and military strategic guidelines and instructions for action. He is responsible for the development, planning, resource allocation and control of the army at the close of the political-strategic and operational-tactical level. He is a member of the army leadership.

Milestones
As a pilot and flight instructor he was active during the nineties, among other things, in the project introduction of the BAE Hawk jet training aircraft and was an air combat instructor on the F-5 Tiger
1992 Captain (OF-2), pilot in the 
1996 Group introduction F/A-18, retraining at the US Navy in Naval Air Station Cecil Field
1998 Leader of the PC-7 Team
2000-2002 Major (OF-3) in the General Staff, commander of the Fliegerstaffel 17 (squadron 17)
2003 Long-term assignment at the Collège Interarmées de Défense in Paris (since 2011 «École Militaire»)
2004-2005 Lieutenant-Colonel (OF-4) in the General Staff, Commander of an Airborne Squadron and Chief Specialist Air Combat
2006-2009 Chief Executive / Staff Formation Luftwaffe (A7)
2009 Head of Doctrine Research and Development
2010 Colonel (OF-5) on the General Staff, Chief Air Defense
2012 Chief A3 / 5, Unterstabschef Operations and Planning
2013, he successfully completed the Master's degree of Advanced Studies in Security Policy and Crisis Management at ETH Zurich
2016 Divisional general, Chief Army Staff,  Chairman of the expert group for the procurement of new combat aircraft

Decorations and awards

Personal life 
Claude Meier is married to Anne Meier-Duttweiler. He lives in Carrouge.

References

External links
 Page about Claude Meier

1964 births
Living people
People from Bülach
Swiss generals
Swiss military officers
Swiss Air Force personnel